is a Japanese manga artist and a graduate of Musashino Art University. She made her professional debut in 1977 with the short story , published in Bessatsu Shōjo Comic magazine. Yoshida is best known for the crime thriller series Banana Fish, which received an anime adaptation produced by MAPPA in 2018.

She is a three time recipient of the Shogakukan Manga Award – for Kisshō Tennyo in 1983 and for Yasha in 2001, both in the  manga category, and for Umimachi Diary in 2015 in the general manga category. In 2007, she received an Excellence Award for manga at the 11th Japan Media Arts Festival for Umimachi Diary, which was later adapted into a feature film titled Our Little Sister. In 2013, she was awarded the 6th Manga Taishō, again for Umimachi Diary.

Works

Series
 , 1978–1981
 , 1983–1985
 , 1983–1984
 , 1985–1986
 , 1985–1994
 , 1988–1994
 , 1995–1996
 , 1996–2002
 , 2003–2005
 , 2006–2018
 , 2019–present

Short story collections 
 , 1983

Anime
, 1985, character designer

Art books
 California Tuning, 1982
 The Making of Bobby's Girl, 1985
 Angel Eyes: Illustration Book Banana Fish, 1994 (1st ed.), 2018 (reprint)
 Double Helix: Illustration Book Yasha, 2003

Awards

References

External links

 Official 40th anniversary blog at Monthly Flowers 
 

1956 births
Living people
 
Female comics writers
Japanese female comics artists
Japanese women writers
Manga artists from Tokyo
Manga Taishō
People from Tokyo
Women manga artists